Sphex funerarius, the golden digger wasp, is a species of digger wasp of the family Sphecidae.

Description
These large, solitary, ground-nesting wasps are black with an orange-red large band on the anterior abdomen. On the head and the body there  is fine and thin hair. Wings are yellowish with darkened tops of the front wings.

Ecology and life cycle
The larvae feed on living insects that the females paralyze and carry to the underground nest. The females of these digger wasps store several grasshoppers in a nest.  They dig a 15 cm long corridor, with various brood chambers, in each of which one prey is stored with an egg. The preys are normally orthopteran insects, particularly nymphs of locusts or katydids. After three to four days, the eggs hatch and after another 18 days, the larvae are fully grown. Adults fly in July and August. They feed on the nectar of flowers (Apiaceae, Euphorbiaceae, etc.).

Distribution
This species is present in southern and central parts of Europe and spread eastward to Central Asia.

Gallery

References

Menke, A.S. und Pulawski, W.J.(2000). A Review of the Sphex flavipennis Species Group — Journal of Hymenoptera Research: Vol. 9, No. 2: S. 324—346

Sphecidae
Articles containing video clips
Insects described in 1934